A movie gimmick is an unusual idea intended to enhance the viewing experience of a film, and thus increase box office sales. Many of these have been used for just a few films, proving unpopular with either audiences or cinema owners. Smell-o-vision, which involved releasing relevant odors during the film, only appeared in the film Scent of Mystery as audiences did not enjoy the experience. Sensurround, a method for enhancing sound pioneered for the 1974 film Earthquake, was abandoned as it sometimes resulted in damage to movie theatres. Other 'gimmicks' have gradually become more common in cinema, as technology has improved. Examples include 3-D film and the use of split screen, which was originally achieved through the use of dual projectors in cinemas.

William Castle
Horror film director William Castle had a particular reputation for gimmicks, being termed 'King of the Gimmicks' by John Waters. For the 1959 film The Tingler, which concerns a creature growing at the base of the spine that can only be killed by screaming, some cinemas installed vibrating devices in the seats which were activated at random during one of the film's scenes, with a voice encouraging the audience to "Scream - scream for your lives." For the 1960 film 13 Ghosts, the onscreen ghosts could either be seen or hidden by the viewer through the use of different coloured cellophane.

Table of gimmick films
3-D and widescreen films have been omitted. For 3-D films, see List of 3D films pre-2005 and List of 3D films. For widescreen films, see Early widescreen feature filmography, Fox Grandeur, CinemaScope, VistaVision, Cinerama, Todd-AO, and IMAX.

See also
 4D film
 Cinerama
 IMAX

References

Sales promotion